The Australian National Immunisation Program Schedule sets out the immunisations Australians are given at different stages in their life. The program aims to reduce the number of preventable disease cases in Australia by increasing national immunisation coverage. The program starts for an Australian when they are born. Vaccinations are given at birth, then again when the baby is 2 months, 4 months, 6 months, 12 months and 18 months. The immunisation schedule continues when the child is 4 years old, and then into adolescent years.  The program is not compulsory and parents have the choice if they want their child vaccinated.

Background 
The National Immunisation Program was first introduced in Australia in 1997. The program was set up by the Commonwealth, state and territory governments. The most recent update to the National Immunisation Program was effective since 1 April 2019. This was an update from the 2007 schedule, one change including the introduction of meningococcal ACWY vaccination for adolescents. The National Immunisation Program Schedule includes vaccines that are funded for children, adolescents and adults. Additional vaccinations necessary when traveling to particular countries are not included in the program, nor are they funded.

"At September 2019, the national immunisation coverage rates were:

 94.27% for all one-year-olds
 91.43% for all two-year-olds
 94.82% for all five-year-olds" according to the Australian Government Department of Health.

The national coverage rate has increased over the last 10 years, as of 2019.

National Immunisation Program Schedule

Childhood vaccinations
Birth

 Hepatitis B

2 weeks (Can be given from 6 weeks of age) 

 Diphtheria 
 Tetanus 
 Pertussis (whooping cough) 
 Hepatitis B 
 Polio 
 Haemophilus influenzae type b 
 Pneumococcal 
 Rotavirus ("First dose must be given by 14 weeks of age, and the second dose by 24 weeks of age")

4 months 

 Diphtheria
 Tetanus
 Pertussis (whooping cough)
 Hepatitis B, polio
 Haemophilus influenzae type b 
 Pneumococcal
 Rotavirus

6 months 

 Diphtheria 
 Tetanus
 Pertussis (whooping cough)
 Hepatitis B, polio
 Haemophilus influenzae type b

12 months 

 Meningococcal ACWY
 Measles, mumps, rubella (MMR Vaccine)
 Pneumococcal

18 months 

 Haemophilus influenzae type b 
 Measles, mumps, rubella (MMR Vaccine)
 Varicella (chickenpox)
 Diphtheria
 Tetanus
 Pertussis (whooping cough)

4 years 

 Diphtheria
 Tetanus
 Pertussis (whooping cough)
 Polio

Adolescent vaccinations
12 – 13 years 

 Human papillomavirus (HPV)
 Diphtheria, tetanus, pertussis (whooping cough)

14 – 16 years 

 Meningococcal ACWY

Adult vaccinations
15 – 49 years 

 Pneumococcal

50 years and over

 Pneumococcal

70 – 79 years  

 Shingles (herpes zoster)

See also 
 COVID-19 vaccination in Australia
 Australian Technical Advisory Group on Immunisation

Citations and references 

attribution contains material from https://www.health.nsw.gov.au/immunisation/Pages/flu.aspx which is available under a CC-BY-4.0 license with attribution "State of New South Wales NSW Ministry of Health. For current information go to www.health.nsw.gov.au."

Vaccination in Australia